Hattikuni  is a panchayat village in the southern state of Karnataka, India. It is located in the Yadgir taluk of Yadgir district in Karnataka.

There are five villages in the gram panchayat: Hattikuni, Bachwar, Bagalmadu, Samnapur, and Yekkhalli.

Demographics
 India census, Hattikuni had a population of 5,056 with 2,636 males and 2,420 females.

See also
 Yadgir
Hattikuni Dam
 Districts of Karnataka

References

External links 
 

Villages in Yadgir district